Berezutskiy (Березуцкий in Russian) is a Russian surname.

It is the surname of the Russian football-playing identical twin brothers, who both played almost their entire career for CSKA Moscow:
 Aleksei Berezutskiy
 Vasili Berezutskiy